Joseph Hutton (18 November 1927 – April 1999) was a Scottish footballer who played in the English Football League for Gillingham, Millwall, Reading and Stoke City.

Career
Hutton was born in Dundee and began his career in England with Reading. He only made eight appearances for the "Royals" before going back to Scotland to play for Ayr United. He and Ayr team-mate Bobby Cairns joined Stoke City in 1953. Hutton made an instant impact at the Victoria Ground scoring in his first three matches for the club. However Hutton was more of a creator than an out and out goal scorer but his Stoke career took at hit when he broke his leg against Blackburn Rovers on 19 March 1955. He only made a few more appearances thereafter and left for Gillingham in 1957. He spent the 1957–58 season with the "Gills" as they suffered relegation to the Fourth Division and he left for Millwall. After two seasons at Millwall he ended his career with non-league Poole Town.

Career statistics
Source:

References

External links
 

Scottish footballers
Stoke City F.C. players
Reading F.C. players
Gillingham F.C. players
Millwall F.C. players
English Football League players
1927 births
1999 deaths
Footballers from Dundee
Ayr United F.C. players
Scottish Football League players
Poole Town F.C. players
Association football inside forwards
Date of death missing